Front. Phys. may refer to
Frontiers in Physics, published by Frontiers Media
Frontiers of Physics, formerly known as Frontiers of Physics in China published by Higher Education Press Springer Verlag